1978 Emperor's Cup Final was the 58th final of the Emperor's Cup competition. The final was played at National Stadium in Tokyo on January 1, 1979. Mitsubishi Motors won the championship.

Overview
Mitsubishi Motors won their 3rd title, by defeating Toyo Industries 1–0. Mitsubishi Motors was featured a squad consisting of Mitsuhisa Taguchi, Kazuo Saito, Hiroshi Ochiai, Mitsunori Fujiguchi, Mitsuo Kato, Kazuo Ozaki and Ikuo Takahara.

Match details

See also
1978 Emperor's Cup

References

Emperor's Cup
1978 in Japanese football
Urawa Red Diamonds matches
Sanfrecce Hiroshima matches